Reginsmál (Old Norse: 'The Lay of Reginn') is an Eddic poem interspersed with prose found in the Codex Regius manuscript. It is closely associated with Fáfnismál, the poem that immediately follows it in the Codex, and it is likely that the two of them were intended to be read together.

The poem, if regarded as a single unit, is disjoint and fragmentary, consisting of stanzas both in ljóðaháttr and fornyrðislag. The first part relates Loki's dealings with Andvari. Interpolated with prose passages, the poem moves on to Sigurd's relationship with Reginn and the advice given to him by Odin.

References

Bibliography

Further reading 
Reginsmol Translation and commentary by Henry A. Bellows
The Second Lay of Sigurd Fafnicide Translation by Benjamin Thorpe

Reginsmál Sophus Bugge's edition of the manuscript text
Reginsmál Guðni Jónsson's edition of the text with normalized spelling

Völsung cycle
Eddic poetry
Sources of Norse mythology
Nibelung tradition